|}

The Stonehenge Stakes is a Listed flat horse race in Great Britain open to two-year-old horses. It is run at Salisbury over a distance of 1 mile (1,609 metres), and it is scheduled to take place each year in August. The race is named after Stonehenge, a prehistoric monument near Salisbury.

The race was first run in 2001, and was awarded Listed status in 2003.

Winners

See also
 Horse racing in Great Britain
 List of British flat horse races

References
 Racing Post:
, 

Flat races in Great Britain
Salisbury Racecourse
Flat horse races for two-year-olds
Recurring sporting events established in 2001
2001 establishments in England